Wesley Dean "Wes" Carr (born 14 September 1982), also recording as Buffalo Tales, is an Australian singer-songwriter and multi-instrumentalist, best known for winning the sixth season of Australian Idol in 2008. He released his first studio album, Simple Sum, independently in 2008 shortly before entering Australian Idol. After Idol, he signed a record deal with Sony Music Australia and released his debut single, "You". The song peaked at number one on the ARIA Singles Chart and was certified Gold by the Australian Recording Industry Association (ARIA). Carr's second studio album, The Way the World Looks, soon followed after. It reached number two on the ARIA Albums Chart and also achieved Gold certification. The second single  "Feels Like Woah" peaked at number 14 and gained Gold certification. In June 2011, Carr released "Been a Long Time", the lead single from his third album. It peaked at number 33 on the ARIA Singles Chart. In November 2011, Carr announced that he was no longer with Sony and would be releasing his album independently. In August 2012 Carr released an EP titled Blood & Bone under the pseudonym Buffalo Tales. His third studio album "Roadtrip Confessions" was released in June 2013 and debuted at number 83.

Early life
Wes Carr was born and raised in Gawler, South Australia, a town near the Barossa Valley on Adelaide's northern fringe. Carr took classes five nights a week at the Johnny Young Talent School, but eventually left Adelaide to live with his father in Sydney at the age of fifteen. From here on, Carr began his DIY education of the music industry, swapping time at school for time at bars, performing and meeting other musicians. His first big gig was supporting Australian band Leonardo's Bride for their last gig at The Basement Carr also played gigs with Missy Higgins, Lior, Paul Mac, Andrew Farriss of INXS and Don Walker of Cold Chisel.

On 3 November 2003, Carr released his debut EP Rhythm to Fly, independently. After Australian band Silverchair went into hiatus in 2003, Carr and Ben Gillies formed the band, Tambalane. Carr and Gilles parted ways in 2005 when an "unpleasant power struggle" emerged between the two. In 2006, Carr worked with C. J. Vanston in Los Angeles, where they co-wrote the song "Say My Name" for the film, For Your Consideration. On 11 June 2008, Carr released his debut studio album, Simple Sum, independently.

Australian Idol 

In 2008, Carr auditioned for the sixth season of Australian Idol. In the top five round, Carr sang Michael Jackson's "Black or White" and received two touchdowns, including one from judge Marcia Hines and guest judge Jermaine Jackson. He also received another touchdown in the top three round, from judge Ian Dickson and a TV throw from judge Kyle Sandilands also he has never being in the bottom 2 or bottom 3 appearance. On 23 November 2008, Carr was announced the winner of Australian Idol of 2008 with Luke Dickens becoming the runner-up. As winner, Carr received a recording contract with Sony Music Australia, a car and $200,000 towards developing his craft.

Recording career

2008–09: The Way the World Looks
After coming out of Australian Idol as the winner, Carr signed to Sony Music Australia. His winner's and debut single, "You" was released immediately for download following his win on 23 November 2008. The song peaked at number one on the ARIA Singles Chart and was certified Gold by the Australian Recording Industry Association (ARIA), for shipments of 35,000 units. Carr's second studio album, The Way the World Looks, was released on 20 March 2009. It debuted at number two on the ARIA Albums Chart and also certified Gold. "Feels Like Woah" was released as the album's second single on 13 February 2009. The song peaked at number fourteen and certified Gold. "Fearless" and "Love Is an Animal" were released as the album's third and fourth singles, respectively.

In May 2009, Carr embarked on a national tour to perform songs from the album. The national tour, "The Way the World Looks LIVE", began on 27 May and ended on 12 July. In September 2009, Carr served as a support act for Irish band The Script's Australian tour. In October, Carr toured with Ian Moss on his national "Shake It Up Tour". The tour began on 8 October and ended on 19 December. At the 2009 ARIA Music Awards, "You" was nominated for "Highest Selling Single", but lost to Jessica Mauboy's "Running Back".

2011–present: Buffalo Tales and Roadtrip Confessions 
Carr's third studio album was scheduled to be released in 2012. In an interview with Adelaide Now, Carr said he wrote the album on his travels to Los Angeles, Nashville, London and Paris, and is full of "personal, candid stories." Its lead single "Been a Long Time" was released for digital download on 10 June 2011. The single peaked at number 33 on the ARIA Singles Chart. In November 2011, Carr announced on that he was no longer with Sony and would release his album independently.

In August 2012, Carr released an EP titled Blood & Bone under the pseudonym Buffalo. This was later changed to Buffalo Tales, given a multitude of artists using the Buffalo moniker. In April 2013, Carr uploaded a cover of Diamonds by Rihanna. The cover was praised on Twitter by Sia, one of the song's co-writers. In May 2013, Carr released "Amsterdam" the lead single from his third studio album – and debut as Buffalo Tales – entitled Roadtrip Confessions. A video for "Amsterdam" was released on 5 June 2013. The single did not chart. Roadtrip Confessions was released on 21 June 2013 and debuted at number 83 on the ARIA Album Chart. The next single was "Puppet Strings".

In November 2016, Carr featured in the Catherine Britt single, "F U Cancer" alongside Kasey Chambers, Beccy Cole, Lyn Bowtell, Josh Pyke and Wendy Matthews.

2018–present: Australiana
In December, Carr self-released a new studio album titled Australiana. The album is a covers album of songs performed by Australian artists.

Personal life 
In February 2011, Carr announced in the Australian OK! magazine, that he was engaged to actress Charlotte Gregg.
Wes married Charlotte in April 2012, and their first child was born later that year.

Discography

Studio albums

Extended plays

Singles

Singles (As featured artists)

Music videos

Awards and nominations

APRA Awards
The APRA Awards are presented annually from 1982 by the Australasian Performing Right Association (APRA), "honouring composers and songwriters". They commenced in 1982.

! 
|-
| 2016  || "Lost" by Cold Chisel (Don Walker & Wes Carr) || Song of the Year ||  || 
|-

ARIA Music Awards
The ARIA Music Awards is an annual awards ceremony that recognises excellence, innovation, and achievement across all genres of Australian music. 

|-
| 2009
| "You"
| ARIA Award for Highest Selling Single
|

Country Music Awards of Australia
The Country Music Awards of Australia (CMAA) (also known as the Golden Guitar Awards) is an annual awards night held in January during the Tamworth Country Music Festival, celebrating recording excellence in the Australian country music industry. They have been held annually since 1973.

|-
| 2017
| "F U Cancer" (with Catherine Britt)
| Vocal Collaboration of the Year
|

References

External links 

1982 births
Australian singer-songwriters
Australian Idol winners
Musicians from Adelaide
Living people
People from Gawler, South Australia
21st-century Australian singers
21st-century Australian male singers
Sony Music artists
Australian male singer-songwriters